Begaim Kirgizbaeva (born 16 June 1987) is a Kazakhstani footballer who plays as a midfielder for Women's Championship club FC Okzhetpes and the Kazakhstan women's national team. She has previously played for Temir Zholy, Alma KTZh and SShVSM-Kairat Almaty at the UEFA Women's Champions League.

She is a member of the Kazakhstani national team since debuting at 16 in 2003, and currently serves as its captain.

International goals

References

1987 births
Living people
Kazakhstani women's footballers
Women's association football midfielders
CSHVSM-Kairat players
BIIK Kazygurt players
Kazakhstan women's international footballers